Odžak (which translates as chimney in Serbo-Croatian) may refer to the following places:

 Odžak, a town in the northern part of Bosnia and Herzegovina
 Odžak (Bugojno), Bosnia and Herzegovina
 Odžak (Glamoč), Bosnia and Herzegovina
 Odžak (Hadžići), Bosnia and Herzegovina
 Odžak (Ilijaš), Bosnia and Herzegovina
 Odžak (Kupres), Bosnia and Herzegovina
 Odžak (Livno), Bosnia and Herzegovina
 Odžak (Nevesinje), Bosnia and Herzegovina
 Odžak (Novo Goražde), Republika Srpska, Bosnia and Herzegovina
 Odžak (Višegrad), Bosnia and Herzegovina
 Odžak, Montenegro

See also 
 Ocak (disambiguation)
 Odžaci, a town in Serbia